Molecular Genetics and Metabolism is a peer-reviewed academic journal published by Academic Press.  It is the official journal of the Society for Inherited Metabolic Disorders.

The editor is E.R.B. McCabe.

Abstracting and indexing 
The journal is abstracted/indexed in:
 EMBASE
 EMBiology
 Scopus

External links 
 

Genetics journals
Academic Press academic journals
Biochemistry journals